Lady Jean Violet Campbell (born 31 May 1997) is a British fashion model.

Early life
Campbell was born in Westminster, London. She is the daughter of Scottish peer Colin Campbell, 7th Earl Cawdor and Lady Isabella Stanhope, a former British Vogue editor and daughter of William Stanhope, 11th Earl of Harrington. She has three younger siblings.

She attended Downe House boarding school in Berkshire.

Career

Her first job was for British Vogue and her second job was a Burberry campaign. Campbell appeared in a Stuart Weitzman advertisement with Kendall Jenner, Willow Smith, and Yang Mi. She has appeared in Louis Vuitton advertisements and runway shows. Campbell has been the face of "for her" by Narciso Rodriguez. She has also appeared in advertisements for Alexander McQueen, Bottega Veneta, Tory Burch, Carolina Herrera, G-Star Raw, David Yurman, Ralph Lauren, and Zara.

Campbell ranked as a "Top 50" model by models.com, and currently ranks on their "Money Girls" list.

References 

Living people
1997 births
Jean
Daughters of British earls
English female models
English people of Scottish descent
Scottish female models
Models from London
People educated at Downe House School
People from Westminster
Louis Vuitton exclusive models